The Stockholm City Line is a commuter railway tunnel beneath central Stockholm in Sweden which is used by the Stockholm Commuter Rail. It has two stations: Stockholm City Station is located directly below T-Centralen, the central station of the Stockholm Metro. The Odenplan station is the other station, and is also served by the Green Line of the Metro. The line opened on 10 July 2017.

Route
The tunnel significantly improves the traffic throughput to and from south of Stockholm as there are only two tracks in that direction from Stockholm Central Station, the same number that were in place in 1871 when the railway was originally built. It has 24 scheduled trains per hour in each direction. The commuter trains pass Stockholm with up to 16 trains per hour per direction. The other eight are regional and long-distance trains. The tunnel takes all commuter trains, allowing more regional and intercity trains to operate along the old line.

Placing the commuter rail traffic into a tunnel of its own thus allows increased capacity for other national rail traffic through Central Station via Centralbron. The entire system for long-distance passenger railways in Sweden suffers from this bottleneck, since 80% of train rides in Sweden start or stop in Stockholm . As a result, there is no room to increase the frequency of commuter, regional, and long-distance trains despite their heavy usage.

Seen from south to north, the route of the Citybanan tunnel branches off the  after Stockholm South Station on Södermalm, and continues beneath the bay bottom of Riddarfjärden at Söderström, beneath the islet of Riddarholmen, beneath Riddarfjärden at Norrström, to the new City Station. From there, it continues beneath Norrmalm to Odenplan Station, then beneath Vasastaden to join with the East Coast Line at Tomteboda.

History

The project was proposed by the Swedish State Railways in 1988 and, after initially being disregarded as too expensive, was seriously considered again from 2002. In 2006, the Swedish Rail Administration agreed with the city and Storstockholms Lokaltrafik on the financing of the project, and the last step in the planning process was scheduled for 2006–2007. The cost of the tunnel and stations was estimated at 16.3 billion Swedish kronor.

After the general elections of 2006, the new Alliance government called the project into question. Representatives of the government announced on October 1 of that year that they were scrapping Citybanan in favor of building a third railway track through the city. In December 2006, however, the government's appointed expert, recommended building the tunnel following a renewed assessment of the project. In May 2007 the government finally decided to build the tunnel. In September 2014 the tunnel reached its full length.

Coordinates:
Southern tunnel entrance: 
Northern tunnel entrance:

References

External links

Swedish Transport Administration – The Stockholm City Line
Dagens Nyheter – Citybanan börjar byggas i sommar 

 
Railway lines in Sweden
Railway lines opened in 2017
Rail transport in Stockholm
Underground commuter rail
2017 establishments in Sweden